Vanessa Siddle Walker is the Samuel Candler Dobbs Professor of African American Educational Studies at Emory University and was president of the American Educational Research Association (AERA) in 2019–20. Walker has studied the segregation of the American educational system for twenty-five years and published the non-fiction work The Lost Education of Horace Tate: Uncovering the Hidden Heroes Who Fought for Justice in Schools.

Education 
Walker received her B.A. in education from the University of North Carolina at Chapel Hill, her M.Ed from Harvard University, and her Ed.D. from Harvard University.

Books

As author
Their Highest Potential: An African American School Community in the Segregated South (University of North Carolina Press, 1996) 
Facing Racism in Education (Harvard Educational Review Reprint Series, 2004)
(with Ulysses Byas) Hello Professor: A Black Principal and Professional Leadership in the Segregated South (University of North Carolina Press, 2009)
The Lost Education of Horace Tate: Uncovering the Hidden Heroes Who Fought for Justice in Schools (The New Press, 2020)

As editor
(with John R. Snarey) Race-ing Moral Formation (Teachers College Press, 2004)
(with Sheryl J. Croft and Tiffany D. Pogue) Living the Legacy: Universities and Schools in Collaborative for African American Children (Rowan and Little, 2018)

Award and honors
Walker's awards and honors include:
Grawmeyer Award for Education
AERA Early Career Award 
Conference of Southern Graduate Schools 
American Education Studies Association
Three awards from AERA Divisions, including Best New Female Scholar, Best New Book, and Outstanding Book
2019–20 President of the American Educational Research Association

References 

University of North Carolina at Chapel Hill School of Education alumni
Harvard Graduate School of Education alumni
Emory University faculty
American educational theorists
Black studies scholars
Year of birth missing (living people)
Living people
Place of birth missing (living people)